HCAW (formerly known as Mr. Cocker HCAW (sponsored name)), in full Honkbalclub Allen Weerbaar, is a Dutch baseball and softball club from Bussum. As of 2021 the club numbers about 400 members, including 270 players, making it one of the largest baseball and softball clubs in the Netherlands. The club's top teams all play in their equivalent Dutch major league.

History
HCAW was established in 1957 as an independent baseball and softball club. Between 1949 and 1957 it operated as the baseball division of the Bussum sporting club Allen Weerbaar. The team played on a football field until 1958 when the city of Bussum agreed to build a baseball field for the club in Bussum Zuid. HCAW added a softball division in 1966.

In the same year HCAW was promoted to the Honkbal Hoofdklasse for the first time. In 1970 the club moved to its current field in the Bussumse Sportvallei. In 1988 HCAW was demoted to the Honkbal Overgangsklasse. Following the degradation financial issues forced the club to fuse with the Amstel Tijgers, a baseball club based in Amsterdam. The fusion team played in the Hoofdklasse under the name HCAW-Tijgers from 1989 to 1994. Since 1995 HCAW has played in the Hoofdklasse under its original name.

Notable players
 Jason Rees, professional baseball player
 Chicho Jesurun, professional baseball player, coach, manager, and scout 
 Iván Granados, Spanish-Venezuelan professional pitcher
 Pavel Budský, Czech professional baseball player
 Sidney de Jong, professional baseball player
 Patrick de Lange, professional baseball player
 Nick Stuifbergen. professional pitcher 
 Calvin Maduro, professional baseball player 
 Ralph Milliard, professional baseball player and coach 
 Dave Draijer, professional baseball player 
 Kenny Berkenbosch, professional baseball player

2011 roster

References

External links

Official site of HCAW (Dutch)

Softball teams
Baseball teams in the Netherlands
Sports clubs in Gooise Meren